Kenneth Lee Reynolds (born January 4, 1947) is an American former professional baseball player who had a six-year career in Major League Baseball between  and . The left-handed pitcher appeared in 103 games for the Philadelphia Phillies, St. Louis Cardinals and San Diego Padres of the National League, and the Milwaukee Brewers, then members of the American League. He began his career as a starting pitcher and ended as a reliever. His MLB appearances were almost evenly split between starting (51) and bullpen assignments (52).

Born in Trevose, Pennsylvania, Reynolds graduated from Marlborough High School (Massachusetts), and attended New Mexico Highlands University.

Reynolds had a good minor-league career, posting a 117–89 won–lost record and a 3.65 career earned run average in 282 games over 12 seasons. But he failed to carry over that success to the major leagues. He lost 29 of his 36 MLB-career decisions (yielding a poor .269 winning percentage), although he played largely for losing teams. In , he lost 15 games and won only two while a member of the last-place Phillies, who dropped 97 of their 156 games played during that strike-shortened season. He lost 12 straight decisions from the start of 1972, tying a National League record. He was traded along with Ken Sanders and Joe Lis to the Minnesota Twins for César Tovar on December 1, 1972. In 375 total MLB innings pitched, he surrendered 370 hits and 196 bases on balls, with 197 strikeouts. His total pro career lasted for 14 years (1966–1979).

After retiring from the mound, Reynolds was a minor league pitching coach in the Toronto Blue Jays' and Chicago Cubs' organizations. He then returned to his alma mater, coaching baseball and teaching physical education and project adventure at Marlborough High School. He is now retired.

References

External links

1947 births
Living people
Baseball players from Pennsylvania
Eugene Emeralds players
Evansville Triplets players
Hawaii Islanders players
Huron Phillies players
Major League Baseball pitchers
Milwaukee Brewers players
New Mexico Highlands Cowboys baseball players
People from Marlborough, Massachusetts
Philadelphia Phillies players
Reading Phillies players
St. Louis Cardinals players
San Diego Padres players
Sportspeople from Middlesex County, Massachusetts
Syracuse Chiefs players
Tidewater Tides players
Toledo Mud Hens players
Tulsa Oilers (baseball) players